The Society of American Historians, founded in 1939, encourages and honors literary distinction in the writing of history and biography about American topics. The approximately 300 members include professional historians, independent scholars, journalists, film and documentary makers, novelists, poets, and biographers, all of whom were selected for membership based on the literary excellence as well as the intellectual strength of their writing or presentation of American history.

Prizes and awards 

The Society sponsors four awards, which are announced at its annual dinner in May:
 The  Francis Parkman Prize, given annually for a nonfiction book in American history that is distinguished by its literary merit, is named for the nineteenth-century historian whose multi-volume work, France and England in North America (Boston, 1865–92), is widely praised for its elegant style as well as its historical depth.
 The Society of American Historians Prize for Historical Fiction, formerly the James Fenimore Cooper Prize, given in odd-numbered years for the best historical novel on an American theme.
 The  Allan Nevins Prize recognizing new scholarship is given annually to the best-written doctoral dissertation on an American subject. The winning dissertation is published by one of the Society's seventeen publisher members, which include both academic and trade presses. The prize is named for the Society's chief founder.
 The Tony Horwitz Prize honoring distinguished work in American history of wide appeal and enduring public significance was awarded for the first time in 2020. The prize commemorates the Society's former president (2016-2017), who died in May 2019. Tony Horwitz was a Pulitzer Prize-winning journalist, a former staff writer for the New Yorker, and a distinguished historian whose distinctive voice was marked by surpassing humanity and grace. The prize is supported by The Cedars Foundation.
 From 2008 to 2017 the Arthur M. Schlesinger Jr. Award was given jointly with the Roosevelt Institute for distinguished writing in American history of enduring public significance. Schlesinger was a preeminent historian of the twentieth century as well as a public intellectual noted for giving history a voice in public affairs.

History 

The Society was founded by Allan Nevins and a few colleagues who were critical of what Nevins in a 1939 Saturday Review article called the "pedantic school" of history—academics who, he said, seemed to take pride in writing badly. Nevins, who taught history for over 35 years at Columbia University, was the author of more than 50 books, including an eight-volume history of the American Civil War and biographies of John D. Rockefeller, Henry Ford, and Grover Cleveland (which won the 1933  Pulitzer Prize for Biography or Autobiography). A journalist for fifteen years before coming to Columbia (he never earned a Ph.D.), Nevins was the master of a robust and readable style, and continued throughout his life to write for radio and the popular press.

Publications 

In 1954, in an effort to bring good historical writing to a wide audience, the Society collaborated in establishing the magazine  American Heritage as a popular illustrated bimonthly. The Society has co-published several books authored by members, including Profiles in Leadership:  Historians on the Elusive Quality of Greatness, edited by  Walter Isaacson (W. W. Norton, 2010); Days of Destiny: Crossroads in American History, edited by  James M. McPherson and  Alan Brinkley (Dorling Kindersley, 2001); and "To the Best of My Ability": The American Presidents, edited by James M. McPherson (Dorling Kindersley, 2000).

Administration 

The Society's officers for 2022/23 are Annette Gordon-Reed, president, and Philip Deloria, vice president. Its administrative office is located at Columbia University; it is supported largely by annual dues from individual and publisher members. It is an affiliate of the American Historical Association.

References

External links 
 

Academic organizations based in the United States
Historians of the United States
History organizations based in the United States
Organizations established in 1939
1939 establishments in the United States